Doorika was a performance arts collective based in Chicago and New York City from 1990-1999. It was a collaborative group with a mix bag of visual artists, performers, non-actors and musicians who worked on developing multi-media theater projects. It was co-founded by John Dooley and Erika Yeomans in 1990. Some of the artists that contributed and worked on the shows were: Eric Koziol, Jon Langford, The Aluminum Group, Casey Spooner, Lisa Perry, Doug Huston, Amy Galper, Ford Wright, Marianne Potje, Deborah Shirley, William F. Wright, Tamara Wasserman, Jim Skish, Celia Bucci, Mot Filipowski, Magica Bottari, Ken Weaver, Amy Kerwin, Matthew Kopp, Kelly Kuvo, LIzzy Yoder, Robert Hungerford, Scott Leuthold (Beggar Weeds), Scott Fulmer, Ken Kobland, Jeremiah Clancy, Peter Redgrave, Carla Bruce-Lee among others.

Doorika made a benefit CD entitled DIG THIS in 1996 by Sweet Pea Records.

They performed at PS 122, Ontological-Hysteric Theater, Chopin Theater, CBGB's Gallery, Chicago Filmmakers, Ohio Theater's Ice Factory Series, Vineyard Theater, Bailiwick Repertory Theatre, St. Mark's Church in-the-Bowery, Downtown Theater Festival among other venues in New York and Chicago.

Works
In A Way It Was A Crisis
Parlando
North of the Lake
Hardhead Flair (also exists as a short art film)
Dear
Throes
Akogare No Pari (the Paris of Our Dreams)

Bathe Me! Dr. Faustus Lights the Lights!
The Forgery (also exists as experimental video and shot by video artist Ken Kobland of The Wooster Group).

References

 "Have Your Fake and Read it too", Time Out NYC, Oct 1998
 Theater Choices, Village Voice, September 29, 1998
 "Retroactive", Surface Magazine, 1st Avant Gardian Issue No 15, September 1998
 
 Women in Performance Journal, by Jon McKenzie, October 1996
 Chicago Tribune, by Justin Hayford, October 1996
 Chicago Tribune, March 20, 1998 Section 7
 "Fractured Voices", Reader, Justin Hayford, Sept 20 1996
 
 Reader, March 20, 1998, by Albet Williams Critic's Choice, Chicago Free Weekly
 Reader March 3, 1995, Critic's Choice, Chicago Free Weekly
 Reader, Dec 14, 1990, Justin Hayford, Chicago Free Weekly
 "Doorika Show Is Quite a Concept", Author(s): Ernest Tucker, Chicago Sun Times, July 16, 1992
 "The many faces of Faust"; Author(s): Hedy Weiss, Chicago Sun Times, September 22, 1996
Throes, Chopin Theater, Chicago, 1994 Review,

Performance artist collectives